Rochester High School is a public high school in Rochester, Washington. It is part of the Rochester School District and serves a rural area of Thurston County. In 2000 both the Fastpitch softball and Boys Basketball teams placed 4th in the state while the Baseball team placed second. The baseball team also placed 2nd in 2006, and won the state championship in 1993. The baseball team won State Championship in 2008.

References

High schools in Thurston County, Washington
Educational institutions established in 1989
Public high schools in Washington (state)
1989 establishments in Washington (state)